Sunčane Skale was a pop music festival held every summer in Herceg Novi, Montenegro. The festival began in 1994. The festival was held every year from 1994 to 2015, except in 1999 - NATO bombing of Yugoslavia. In 2016, it was cancelled for financial reasons.

The festival
The festival lasts for three days. On the first day, the Prinčeva nagrada (Prince's award) is given to singers who won a nomination in a certain category. On day two the festival introduces new talent into the world; it's also called Nove zvijezde (New stars). On the final day singers sing a song and if it wins, it becomes the song of the summer (Pjesma ljeta).

Winners
This is a list of the winners of Sunčane Skale day three: Pjesma ljeta

1994 - Maja Nikolić - "Baš sam se zaljubila"               
1995 - Filip Žmaher 
1996 - Leontina Vukomanović - "Jedna od sto"
1997 - Zorana Pavić - "Hoću da umrem dok me voliš" 
1998 - Vlado Georgiev - Ako ikad ostarim
2000 - Tifa and Makadam - "Evo ima godina" 
2001 - Ivana Banfić - "Sad je kasno"
2002 - Tijana Dapčević - "Negativ"
2003 - Bojan Marović - "Tebi je lako"
2004 - Romana Panić - "Nikad i zauvijek"
2005 - Goran Karan - "Ružo moja bila"
2006 - Milena Vučić - "Da l' ona zna" (Winner of Nove zvijezde)
2007 - Lejla Hot - "Suza stihova" (Winner of Nove zvijezde)
2008 - Aleksandra Bučevac - "Ostani"
2009 - Kaliopi and Naum Petreski - "Rum dum dum"
2010 - Dado Topić and Anita Popović - "Govore mojim glasom anđeli"
2011 - Qpid - "Under the radar"
2012 - J-DA - "Gel gel"
2013 - Teška industrija and Kemal Monteno - Majske kiše
2014 - Dimitar Andonovski - "Ako me boli" (only Nove zvijezde)
2015 - Karin Soiref - "Sing my song" (only Nove zvijezde)

External links
Official Website
Non-official Website in English

 
Summer festivals
Music festivals in Montenegro
Herceg Novi
Recurring events established in 1994
Recurring events disestablished in 2015
Music competitions
1994 establishments in Yugoslavia
Summer events in Montenegro